Sword of Sherwood Forest is a 1960 British Eastman Color adventure film in MegaScope directed by Terence Fisher for Hammer Film Productions. Richard Greene reprises the role of Robin Hood, which he played in The Adventures of Robin Hood on TV from 1955 to 1959.

Plot
The Sheriff of Nottingham plans to confiscate the estate of the Lord of Bawtry, a nobleman who has died on Crusade. The Archbishop of Canterbury, speaks against this plan and the Sheriff plots to eliminate him. Robin Hood is asked to undertake the assassination of the Archbishop for the plotters, led by the Earl of Newark and Lord Melton, but on realising who the intended target is, resolves to help the Archbishop instead.

Maid Marian also wants to meet the Archbishop so she can grant freedom to the family of a man murdered by the Sheriff's men, and she is also keen to meet Robin again who she met when she thought he was a common outlaw, but now realises he is on the side of good.

Main cast

Cast notes
 Apart from Greene, none of the original cast from The Adventures of Robin Hood appear in the film.

Reception
The New York Times wrote: "It's business as usual, but hold on. Alan Hackney's script and Terence Fisher's direction keep the incidents jouncing...a nicely tinted Sherwood Forest is as pretty as could be, and Sarah Branch is certainly the curviest Lady Marian we've ever seen. Mr. Greene is aptly limber, and Peter Cushing, Richard Pasco and an unidentified "Archbishop of Canterbury" are excellent".

Score
The film's music was composed by Alun Hoddinott, with songs by Stanley Black.

Production
While most Hammer films of that period were filmed at the company's permanent home at Bray Studios, Sword of Sherwood Forest was made at Ardmore Studios in Bray, County Wicklow, in Ireland.

References

External links
 
 
 
 

1960 films
1960s historical adventure films
British historical adventure films
Columbia Pictures films
Hammer Film Productions films
Robin Hood films
Films shot in the Republic of Ireland
Films directed by Terence Fisher
Films based on television series
1960s English-language films
1960s British films